The following is a list of charter schools in Arizona (including networks of such schools) grouped by county, with the exception of Phoenix, Arizona, a city large enough to merit its own category.

Cochise County

Center for Academic Success Charter School 
Leman Academy of Excellence (Sierra Vista)
Liberty Traditional Charter School (Douglas)
Omega Alpha Academy

Coconino County

Flagstaff Arts and Leadership Academy
Flagstaff Junior Academy 
Mountain Charter School 
Northland Preparatory Academy
The PEAK School 
Pine Forest School

Gila County

Destiny School 
Liberty High School
New Visions Academy

Maricopa County (excluding Phoenix)

American Leadership Academy
American Virtual Academy 
Arizona Charter Academy
Arizona Connections Academy 
Arts Academy at Estrella Mountain 
Ball Charter Schools (Dobson, Val Vista)
Benjamin Franklin Charter School 
Calibre Academy 
Cambridge Academy
Candeo Schools
Challenge Charter School
Challenger Basic School
Concordia Charter School
Country Gardens Charter School
Crown Charter School
Desert Heights Charter Schools
East Valley Academy and Crossroads
Edkey Schools (George Washington, Pathfinder, Sequoia Eastmark, Sequoia Charter, Sequoia Verrado Way, Sequoia Choice, Sequoia Deaf, Sequoia Lehi, Sequoia Pathway)
Eduprize Schools
Ethos Academy
FrenchAm Schools
Gila Crossing Community School
Great Hearts Academies (Archway Classical, Anthem Prep, Arete Prep, Chandler Prep, Glendale Prep, Lincoln Prep, Roosevelt, Scottsdale Prep, Trivium Prep)
Happy Valley School 
Heritage Academy (Mesa, Arizona)
Hirsch Academy 
Imagine Schools (East Mesa, Rosefield, Surprise)
Incito Schools 
IntelliSchool (Chandler, Glendale)
James Madison Preparatory School
Kaizen Schools (Discover U, El Dorado, Gilbert Arts, Glenview Prep, Liberty Arts, Skyview, Vista Grove Prep)
Leading Edge Academy 
Legacy Traditional Schools (Chandler, East Mesa, Gilbert, Glendale, Goodyear, Laveen, Mesa, North Chandler, Peoria, Surprise, West Surprise)
Leman Academy of Excellence (Mesa)
MASSA Academy of Math & Science (Glendale, Peoria)
The New School for the Arts and Academics
New Horizon School for the Performing Arts
Noah Webster Charter Schools
Odyssey Prep Academy Schools
Paradise Honors High School
Pinnacle Charter Schools
Polytechnic High School (Arizona)
PPEP TEC High Schools
Primavera Online High School
Self Development Academy (East Mesa, Glendale, Mesa)
Skyline Schools  (AZ Compass Prep, Gila River, Vector Prep/Arts)
Step Up Schools
Student Choice High School
Tempe Accelerated High School
Tempe Preparatory Academy
ThrivePoint High Schools

Mohave County

Desert Star Academy 
Kaizen Schools (Havasu Prep)
Kingman Academy of Learning
Masada Charter School 
Mohave Accelerated Learning Center
Pillar Academy of Business & Finance 
Telesis Preparatory Academy 
Young Scholar's Academy

Navajo County
Edkey Schools (Sequoia Village)

City of Phoenix

ACCLAIM Academy
All Aboard Charter School 
American Charter Schools Foundation (Alta Vista, Apache Trail, Crestview Prep, Desert Hills, Estrella, Peoria Accelerated, Ridgeview Prep, South Pointe, South Ridge, Sun Valley, West Phoenix)
Arizona Agribusiness and Equine Center
Arizona Language Preparatory 
Arizona School for the Arts
ASU Preparatory Academy, Phoenix High School
Ball Charter Schools (Hearn)
Bennett Academy
Career Success Schools
CASA Academy
Choice Academies
Cornerstone Charter High School
Deer Valley Academy
EAGLE College Prep Schools
Edkey Schools (AZ Conservatory, Caurus, Children First)
Empower College Prep
Espiritu Schools
Freedom Academy
Girls Leadership Academy of Arizona
Great Hearts Academies (Archway Classical, Cicero Prep, Maryvale Prep, North Phoenix Prep)
Horizon Honors Schools
Imagine Schools (Academy of Phoenix, Bell Canyon, Camelback, Cortez Park, Desert West) 
IntelliSchool (Metro Center, Paradise Valley)
International Commerce High School
Kaizen Schools (Advance U, Leona Connected, Maya High, Quest, South Pointe, Summit)
Legacy Traditional Schools
Liberty Traditional Charter School
Madison Highland Prep
MASSA Academy of Math & Science (Camelback, Desert Sky, Flower)
Metropolitan Arts Institute
Midtown Primary School
Milestones Charter School
NFL YET
North Pointe Preparatory
Paideia Academy
Painted Rock Academy
Pan-American Charter School
Pensar Academy
Phoenix Advantage Charter School
Phoenix College Preparatory Academy
Phoenix International Academy
Pioneer Preparatory School
Premier High School 
Ridgeline Academy
RSD High School
Sage Academy
Scottsdale Country Day School
Self Development Academy
Skyline Schools  (Skyline Prep, South Phoenix Prep/Arts, South Valley)
Southwest Leadership Academy
Stepping Stones Academy
Synergy Public School
Think Through Academy
Valley Academy
Victory Collegiate Academy
Vista College Preparatory
Western School of Science and Technology

Pima County

Academy Del Sol
Academy of Building Industries
Academies of Math & Science
Academy of Tucson
Accelerated Learning Laboratory
Basis Schools
Canyon Rose Academy
Carden of Tucson Charter School
CITY Center for Collaborative Learning
Compass High School (Tucson, Arizona)
CPLC Community Schools (Hiaki, Toltecalli)
Desert Rose Academy Charter School
Desert Sky Community School
Edge High School
Great Expectations Academy
Highland Free School
Legacy Traditional Schools (Northwest Tucson)
Leman Academy of Excellence (Central Tucson, East Tucson, Marana, Oro Valley)
MASSA Academy of Math & Science (Desert Sky, Prince, South Mountain)
Mexicayotl Academy of Excellence
Mountain Rose Academy
Open Doors Community School
Pima Rose Academy
Satori School
Southern Arizona Community Academy
Southgate Academy
Tucson Country Day School
Tucson International Academy
Tucson Preparatory School
Vision Charter School

Pinal County

Apache Trail High School
ASU Preparatory Academy, Casa Grande
Avalon Elementary 
Grande Innovation Academy 
Imagine Schools (Avondale, Coolidge, Superstition)
Kaizen Schools (Mission Heights Prep)
Legacy Traditional Schools (Avondale, Casa Grande, Maricopa, Queen Creek)
MASSA Academy of Math & Science (Avondale)

Santa Cruz County
Kaizen Schools (Colegio Petite)

Yavapai County

Canyon View Preparatory Academy
Desert Star Community School 
Edkey Schools (American Heritage Academy Camp Verde & Cottonwood)
Franklin Phonetic Primary School
La Tierra Community School
Mingus Springs Charter School
Mountain Oak Charter School
Pace Preparatory Academy
Park View Middle School
Prescott Valley School
Sedona Charter School
Tri-City College Prep High School

Yuma County
Carpe Diem e-Learning Community

References

Charter